Barbara is a 2017 French drama film directed by Mathieu Amalric. It stars Jeanne Balibar and Mathieu Amalric. It tells the story of an actress who prepares to portray the famous French singer Barbara. The film had its world premiere in the Un Certain Regard section at the 2017 Cannes Film Festival on 18 May 2017. It was released in France on 6 September 2017.

Plot
Brigitte is preparing for the role of the famous French singer Barbara. The actress carefully studies the character, gestures, manners, and intonations. She learns the music scores, mimics her facial expression, but, as Brigitte does and more and more of it, she gradually merges with the character. The director is also preparing to shoot the film: he studies archival footage and painstakingly selects the music. He is inspired and even possessed—but with Barbara or with her new incarnation?

Cast
 Jeanne Balibar as Brigitte
 Mathieu Amalric as Yves Zand
 Vincent Peirani as Roland Romanelli
 Aurore Clément as Esther
 Grégoire Colin as Charley Marouani

Release
The film had its world premiere in the Un Certain Regard section at the 2017 Cannes Film Festival on 18 May 2017. It was released in France on 6 September 2017.

Reception

Critical response
On review aggregator website Rotten Tomatoes, the film holds an approval rating of 83% based on 18 reviews, and an average rating of 6.97/10. On Metacritic, the film has a weighted average score of 68 out of 100, based on 7 critics, indicating "generally favorable reviews".

Jay Weissberg of Variety praised Jeanne Balibar's performance in the film, saying: "She has not only Barbara's look but also her gestures down pat, and the uncanny way in which the editing conflates actress with subject keeps interest relatively high." Leslie Felperin of The Hollywood Reporter called the film "a self-reflexive and sometimes screamingly self-indulgent work that's strictly for hardcore French viewers and festivals."

Accolades

References

External links
 

2017 films
2017 drama films
French drama films
2010s French-language films
Films directed by Mathieu Amalric
Louis Delluc Prize winners
Films featuring a Best Actress César Award-winning performance
2010s French films